Peter Kavanagh may refer to:

Peter Kavanagh (footballer) (1910–1993), Irish footballer
Peter Kavanagh (writer) (1916–2006), writer, scholar, and publisher 
Peter Kavanagh (politician) (born 1959), Australian politician and legal academic
Peter Kavanagh (Stargate Atlantis), fictional character from Stargate Atlantis
Peter Kavanagh (producer) (1953–2016), Canadian radio producer, creator of Canada Reads
Peter Kavanagh (author) (born 1958), writer, novels and short stories
Peter Cavanagh (born 1981), English footballer for Liverpool and Accrington Stanley
Peter Cavanagh (impressionist) (1914–1981), English comic impressionist